Miroslav Indrák (born August 12, 1995) is a Czech professional ice hockey player. He is currently playing for HC Plzeň of the Czech Extraliga.

Indrák made his Czech Extraliga debut playing with HC Plzeň during the 2013-14 Czech Extraliga season.

References

External links

1995 births
Living people
HC Plzeň players
Czech ice hockey forwards
Sportspeople from Písek